The 2021 Tercera División play-offs to Segunda División RFEF from Tercera División (promotion play-offs) were the final play-offs for the promotion from 2020–21 Tercera División to 2021–22 Segunda División RFEF. The last four teams from the promotion groups and the top two clubs from the Play-off groups qualified for this stage.

Format
Due to the health crisis caused by the COVID-19 pandemic in Spain, the RFEF decided for this season that there would be no games between teams from different Territorial Federations and thus not have problems with mobility restrictions. In addition, the remodeling of the RFEF national categories allows each Third Division group to have three promotion slots to the new Segunda División RFEF category, one of them through promotion play-offs.

Six teams qualify from each of the Third Division groups. Four of them come from the groups called "C" or "promotion", and are those classified between the third and sixth position since the first two achieve direct promotion. The other two teams come from the groups called "D" or "play-off", and are the first two classified.

As in the previous season, the promotion promotion was a single match in which the highest ranked teams has an advantage in the event of a tie. The fifth classified of group "C" faced the second classified of group "D"; and the sixth of the "C" did the same with the first of the "D". The winners of this first round faced the third and fourth teams of group "C" in the final round, deciding the third place for promotion in each of the groups.

Qualified teams

Group 1 – Galicia

 Promoted teams:
 Promotion group: Arenteiro and Bergantiños
 Play-off: Arosa

Group 2 – Asturias

 Promoted teams:
 Promotion group: Ceares and Llanera
 Play-off: Avilés

Group 3 – Cantabria

 Promoted teams:
 Promotion group: Cayón and Rayo Cantabria
 Play-off: Tropezón

Group 4 – Basque Country

 Promoted teams:
 Promotion group: Gernika and Real Sociedad C
 Play-off: Sestao River

Group 5 – Catalonia

 Promoted teams:
 Promotion group: Europa and Terrassa
 Play-off: Cerdanyola del Vallès

Group 6 – Valencian Community

 Promoted teams:
 Promotion group: Eldense and Alzira
 Play-off: Intercity

Group 7 – Community of Madrid

 Promoted teams:
 Promotion group: Leganés B and Unión Adarve
 Play-off: Móstoles URJC

Group 8 – Castile and León

 Promoted teams:
 Promotion group: Gimnástica Segoviana and Cristo Atlético
 Play-off: Burgos Promesas

Group 9 – Eastern Andalusia and Melilla

 Promoted teams:
 Promotion group: Vélez and Atlético Mancha Real
 Play-off: Antequera

Group 10 – Western Andalusia and Ceuta

 Promoted teams:
 Promotion group: Xerez Deportivo and San Roque de Lepe
 Play-off: Ceuta

Group 11 – Balearic Islands

 Promoted teams:
 Promotion group: Ibiza Islas Pitiusas and Andratx
 Play-off: Formentera

Group 12 – Canary Islands

 Promoted teams:
 Promotion group: Mensajero and Panadería Pulido
 Play-off: San Fernando

Group 13 – Region of Murcia

 Promoted teams:
 Promotion group: Águilas and Atlético Pulpileño
 Play-off: Mar Menor

Group 14 – Extremadura

 Promoted teams:
 Promotion group: Cacereño and Montijo
 Play-off: Coria

Group 15 – Navarre

 Promoted teams:
 Promotion group: Peña Sport and San Juan
 Play-off: Ardoi

Group 16 – La Rioja

 Promoted teams:
 Promotion group: Racing Rioja and Náxara
 Play-off: UD Logroñés B

Group 17 – Aragon

 Promoted teams:
 Promotion group: Teruel and Brea
 Play-off: Huesca B

Group 18 – Castilla–La Mancha

 Promoted teams:
 Promotion group: Marchamalo and Calvo Sotelo
 Play-off: Toledo

Promoted teams
The 36 teams that were promoted through promotion groups are included.
The numbers of years after the last promotion are referred to the last participation of the club in Segunda División B, the division that was partially replaced by the Segunda División RFEF.

See also
2021 Segunda División play-offs
2021 Segunda División B play-offs

References

External links
Play-offs at Futbolme

2021
play-offs
3